Waffles + Mochi is a children's cooking streaming television series. Produced by Higher Ground Productions with Michelle Obama as executive producer, it was released on Netflix on March 16, 2021.

Three companion books were also released in 2021: Follow That Food! by Christy Webster and Sarah Rebar, Pickle Party by Frank Berrio and Sarah Rebar, and Waffles + Mochi: Get Cooking! by Yewande Komolafe.

On November 23, 2021, Netflix released a special holiday episode titled "Waffles + Mochi's Holiday Feast". On October 17, 2022, Netflix released a spinoff series titled Waffles + Mochi's Restaurant.

Premise 

Waffles (whose dad is a frozen waffle and mother is a yeti) and Mochi (a mochi ball) are two friends that wish they could become chefs but live in the land of frozen food where everything is made of ice. They're hired as employees of a grocery store owned by Michelle Obama. Through the series they encounter tasks they need to accomplish and travel around the world on Magicart where they meet chefs, other food experts, and learn to eat and make different kinds of foods in each episode.

Cast 

 Michelle Zamora as Waffles
 Piotr Michael as Mochi (voice)
 Russ Walko as Mochi (puppeteer)
 Jonathan Kidder as Busy Bee, the store manager
 Diona Elise Burnett as Magicart and Steve the Mop
 Lyric Lewis as Baker
 Taleia Gilliam as Shelfie
 Katie Leclerc as herself
 Michelle Obama as herself
 Sia as Tomato 
 Kira Hagi as a double for Waffles
 Arturo Castro, Chris Fleming, and Demi Adejuyigbe as Cheese Boy Band.

Episodes

Season 1 (2021)

Special (2021)

Production and release 
Waffles + Mochi was produced by Higher Ground Productions, the production company founded by former President and First Lady of the United States Barack Obama and Michelle Obama. It is one of the first programs to be made by the company for Netflix. Executive produced by Erika Thormahlen, Jeremy Konner, Tonia Davis, Priya Swaminathan, Alex Braverman and the Obamas, it was announced on February 9, 2021, and its trailer was released on February 11. All episodes were made available to stream on Netflix on March 16, 2021.

Puppets 
The puppets were created by Viva La Puppet and had the unusual feature of being able to eat food on camera for multiple takes. Waffles had a "hidden pocket" that's cleanable along with a specifically designed glove to let Waffles eat hot food safely, according to Waffle's puppeteer Michelle Zamora. To improve Zamora's real-time reactions to Waffles eating food, they rigged the sets so Zamora could eat at the same time as Waffles and she said she was "getting spoon-fed tortellini from Massimo Bottura — world-renowned chefs!" They had "three or four puppets" on set for the eating scenes in case the puppets got too messy and were unable to be cleaned. The original plans for the puppets had them "as detailed as possible with animatronics" but decided to keep them simpler and Sesame Street-like with "puppetry rods clearly visible".

Critical reception
On the review aggregation website Rotten Tomatoes, Waffles + Mochi holds a approval rating of 95% with an average rating 8.40/10, based on 20 reviews. On Metacritic, it has a score of 82 out of 100 based on 12 reviews, indicating "universal acclaim".

The Guardian critic Adrian Horton, giving the series a rating of 4 out of 5 stars, wrote that it is "hard to fault" and that it "strikes the difficult balance between didacticism, age-appropriate messaging and zany fun". The Los Angeles Times' Robert Lloyd described the series as "a well-balanced mix of familiar ingredients: a fanciful set, documentary visits to far-flung places, real kids being real, comical or calming adults, and puppets", while Sonia Saraiya of Vanity Fair wrote that Waffles + Mochi "feels wholesomely entertaining" as a show. Time's Judy Berman penned that the series is the "Sesame Street of food TV", describing it as "engaging, illuminating, curious and effortlessly inclusive".

On November 1, 2022, the series was nominated for five Children's and Family Emmy Awards including Outstanding Preschool Series at the 1st Children's and Family Emmy Awards.

References

External links
 
 
 

2021 American television series debuts
2020s American children's television series
2020s American cooking television series
2020s preschool education television series
American preschool education television series
American television shows featuring puppetry
Netflix children's programming
English-language Netflix original programming
Television series by Higher Ground Productions
Michelle Obama